John Crace (born 9 October 1956) is a British journalist and critic. He attended Exeter University.  Crace is the parliamentary sketch writer for The Guardian, having replaced the late Simon Hoggart in 2014, and previously also wrote the paper's "Digested Read" column. He is a supporter of Tottenham Hotspur F.C. and has written several books on the club. He blogs for ESPN FC on Tottenham. According to his columns, he is an enthusiastic collector of ceramic pots.

Writing in 2019, Crace described his "cold turkey" rehabilitation from heroin addiction 32 years previously.

In July 2019 The Guardian retracted statements by Crace implying that journalist Isabel Oakeshott had obtained confidential files by sleeping with Nigel Farage and Arron Banks. His article included the claim that Oakeshott only got confidential emails if Farage and Banks "slips it to her". Following the threat of legal action by Oakeshott, the text was amended to:  "leave it conveniently tucked under her pillow". This second revision was then removed, with the final version stating: "if he or Arron Banks leave it conveniently to one side for her". Oakeshott stated: "It gives me great pleasure to teach ⁦John Crace⁩ and The ⁦Guardian a little lesson about casually slurring women whose politics they dislike".

Bibliography
Wasim and Waqar: Imran's Inheritors (1992)
The Digested Read (2005)
Vertigo: Spurs, Bale and One Fan's Fear of Success (2011)
Brideshead Abbreviated: The Digested Read of the Twentieth Century (2012)
Harry's Games: Inside the Mind of Harry Redknapp (2013)
The Digested Twenty-first Century (2014)
 
  
  A Farewell to Calm. Guardian Faber. 2021. ISBN 978-1783352449.

References

External links

Column archive at The Guardian
"The Digested Read"
Journalisted – Articles by John Crace

Living people
Alumni of the University of Exeter
British male journalists
British sportswriters
The Guardian journalists
1956 births